KTTH (770 AM) is a commercial radio station in Seattle, Washington.  It is owned by Salt Lake City–based Bonneville International, a broadcasting company owned by of The Church of Jesus Christ of Latter-day Saints, and airs a conservative talk radio format.  The station's transmitter is on Vashon Island, while its studios are located in Seattle's Eastlake district.

By day, KTTH broadcasts with 50,000 watts, the maximum permitted for AM radio stations, but because AM 770 is a clear-channel frequency, it must reduce power to 5,000 watts at night to avoid interfering with other stations.  Programming is also heard on FM translator K233BU at 94.5 MHz.

Programming
Bonneville owns three talk stations in Seattle.  97.3 KIRO-FM concentrates on mostly local shows while 770 KTTH airs mostly syndicated programming.  710 ESPN, also known as KIRO (AM), is a sports talk station. On weekdays, KTTH has three local shows: The Bryan Suits Show, The Jason Rantz Show and The Michael Medved Show. Other syndicated programming includes Dan Bongino, Mark Levin, Ben Shapiro, Michael Knowles, Guy Benson and America's 1st News with Matt Ray. 

On weekends, KTTH features shows on health, money, retirement and real estate, which are brokered programming.

History

Classical music
The station signed on in 1925. From 1927 to 1986, it used the call sign KXA.  During the 1960s and 70s, KXA had a classical music format. It competed with KING-FM 98.1 and KUOW-FM 94.9, which both aired classical music on the FM dial. As FM became more popular for listening to classical music, on October 1, 1980, the station changed to an oldies format and was known as "Old Gold 77 KXA".

Oldies and country
Following a bankruptcy filing, the station switched from oldies to brokered Christian radio programming in 1983. The station's license was transferred to new owners that same year, and on October 8, 1984, a format called "love songs" began, which was essentially a return to oldies.

In 1986, following a sale to Highsmith Broadcasting, the station flipped to a simulcast of country music station KRPM-FM (now KBKS-FM) and changed its call letters to KRPM.  In 1991, the station changed call letters to KULL, returning again to oldies. Country music returned in January 1995, as did the simulcast with KRPM.

Talk programming
In November 1995, a format swap was made with AM 1090, with 770 receiving the call letters KNWX and an all-news radio format. That was followed by a switch to business talk programming in 1998.

KTTH acquired its current call letters in 2003, along with a flip to conservative talk.  KNWX moved to 1210 AM that same year and continued until 2004, when it was renamed KWMG (now KMIA).

Sports
KTTH was the last flagship radio station of the Seattle SuperSonics (now Oklahoma City Thunder) of the National Basketball Association, from 2006 to 2008. The station serves as a backup station to KIRO for Seattle Mariners and Washington State Cougars play-by-play when the Seahawks are playing at the same time. It also carries Seattle University men's basketball coverage.

References

External links
FCC History Cards for KTTH
AM 770 KTTH

TTH
News and talk radio stations in the United States
Radio stations established in 1927
Bonneville International
1927 establishments in Washington (state)
Conservative talk radio